Harald Kohr (born 14 March 1962) is a German football coach and a former player. He signed with VfB Stuttgart in the 1989 off-season after finishing in the top ten of Bundesliga scorers for three consecutive seasons, but suffered a serious knee injury with few days to go before the season opening and had to leave the team.

References

External links
 

Living people
1962 births
Sportspeople from Trier
Association football forwards
German footballers
Footballers from Rhineland-Palatinate
German football managers
SV Eintracht Trier 05 players
1. FC Kaiserslautern players
Grasshopper Club Zürich players
SG Wattenscheid 09 players
Bundesliga players
CS Grevenmacher managers
Jeunesse Esch managers